Konrad the White may refer to:

 Konrad VII the White (aft. 1396 – 1452)
 Konrad X the White (1420–1492)